Mario Margalef (born 3 November 1953) is a former Uruguayan cyclist. He competed in the individual road race at the 1972 Summer Olympics.

References

External links
 

1943 births
Living people
Uruguayan male cyclists
Olympic cyclists of Uruguay
Cyclists at the 1972 Summer Olympics
Place of birth missing (living people)